Mbalwa is a neighborhood in Kyaliwajjala Parish, Kira Municipality, Wakiso District in the Central Region of Uganda.

Location
The neighborhood is bounded by Nsawo and Bbuto to the north, Bweyogerere to the east and south-east, Kireka to the south and south-west, Naalya and Kyaliwajjala to the west and Namugongo to the northwest. The geographical coordinates of Mbalwa are: 0°22'13.0"N,  32°39'23.0"E (Latitude:0.370278; Longitude:32.656389).

Overview
Mbalwa is primarily an upscale residential neighborhood, with many of the private residences enclosed in perimeter fences and re-enforced metal gates. It is generally considered a safe neighborhood, with a neighborhood-watch system that uses online social networks. The neighborhood is accessible by foot, bicycle, boda-boda motorcycle taxi, private car, commuter taxi, and by public bus service.

Points of interest
The following points of interest lie within the neighborhood or close to its boundaries: (a) the headquarters of Uganda National Bureau of Standards in Bweyogerere Industrial Park, to the immediate east of Mbalwa. (b) the eastern end of the Kampala Northern Bypass Highway, borders the southern perimeter of the Mbalwa neighborhood, separating it from Kireka and Naalya.

See also
List of cities and towns in Uganda
Kira, Uganda

References

Populated places in Central Region, Uganda
Cities in the Great Rift Valley
Wakiso District